This is a round-up of the 1990 Sligo Senior Football Championship. Shamrock Gaels claimed their first ever senior title in this year, in their first final appearance, defeating fellow outsiders Curry in the process. This year's final was the first which Tubbercurry did not contest since 1982.

First round

Quarter finals

Semi-finals

Sligo Senior Football Championship Final

References

 Sligo Champion (July–September 1990)

Sligo Senior Football Championship
Sligo Senior Football Championship